Adriano Ferreira Pinto  (born December 10, 1979 in Quinta do Sol), or simply Ferreira Pinto, is a Brazilian football winger playing for Varese.

He played for São José Esporte Clube in Brazil before joining S.S. Lanciano in 2002 in Italy's Serie C1.  He then moved up to Serie B with Perugia and Cesena.

In October 2008, Ferreira Pinto extended his contract with Atalanta to June 2011.
During the last days of winter's market he signed a contract until June with the Serie B team Varese.

Personal life 
Ferreira Pinto was born in Quinta do Sol, Paranà. He grew up in a very poor family and at the age of 15 he lost his father. Until the age of 18 he worked as bricklayer and day laborer.

Once in Italy he meets Marianna, who married June 7, 2009 in Lanciano, Abruzzo. On June 7, 2009 he becomes a father of José Carlos.

Career 
Ferreira Pinto began his career at União São João in the Campeonato Brasileiro Série C. During his first season he managed 28 goals.

In 2001, he was close to joining Standard Liège, but last moment he changed his mind and signed for Lanciano in Serie C1. He played for the Frentani until August 2004, scoring 15 goals in 71 matches.

On July 1, 2004 signed for Perugia, in italian Serie B. He made his debut in the 2–1 win against Crotone on 11 September 2004. On 21 September, Ferreira Pinto scored his first goal for Perugia in a 2–0 victory against Treviso.

At the end of the season Perugia failed and Ferreira Pinto signed for Cesena. He finished 2005–2006 season scoring 11 goals in 39 matches.

Honours

Atalanta 
 Serie B (1): 2010–2011

External links

  Atalanta B.C. Official Player Profile

1979 births
Living people
Brazilian footballers
União São João Esporte Clube players
S.S. Virtus Lanciano 1924 players
A.C. Perugia Calcio players
A.C. Cesena players
Atalanta B.C. players
S.S.D. Varese Calcio players
Serie A players
Serie B players
Expatriate footballers in Italy
Brazilian expatriate footballers
Association football forwards
Sportspeople from Paraná (state)